William Grover Smith (April 27, 1857 – November 3, 1921) was the sixth Lieutenant Governor of Colorado, serving from 1889 to 1891 under Job Adams Cooper. He became the speaker of the General Assembly in January 1899. He was a tramway official and lawyer.

References

Lieutenant Governors of Colorado
1857 births
1921 deaths